The Glenwood Iron Mountain Railroad Depot is a historic train station building in Glenwood, Arkansas.   It is a single-story wood-frame structure, located just west of the point were U.S. Route 70 crosses the Union Pacific tracks.  It was built  by the St. Louis, Iron Mountain and Southern Railway, and used by that railroad and its successor, the Missouri Pacific Railroad until 1969.  It was sold that year and relocated out of town for use as a hay barn.  The city purchased the building in 1995, and returned it to a location a short way south of its original location, which is now occupied by a major road intersection.

The depot was listed on the National Register of Historic Places in 1996.

See also
National Register of Historic Places listings in Pike County, Arkansas

References

Railway stations on the National Register of Historic Places in Arkansas
Transportation in Pike County, Arkansas
National Register of Historic Places in Pike County, Arkansas
Stations along Missouri Pacific Railroad lines
St. Louis, Iron Mountain and Southern Railway
Railway stations in the United States opened in 1910
Railway stations closed in 1969
Former railway stations in Arkansas
Relocated buildings and structures in Arkansas
1910 establishments in Arkansas